Wolfpen Creek  is a stream in Bourbon and Allen counties, in the U.S. state of Kansas.

Wolfpen Creek was named for the great number of wolves seen there by early settlers.

See also
List of rivers of Kansas

References

Rivers of Allen County, Kansas
Rivers of Bourbon County, Kansas
Rivers of Kansas